Bayakou may refer to:

 Bayakou (Benin), a village in Benin
 Bayakou (trade), latrine cleaners in Haiti